Thomas Sidney Jerome Sturridge  is an English actor. His early films include Being Julia (2004), Like Minds (2006), and The Boat That Rocked (2009). He was nominated for the Tony Award for Best Actor in a Play for his performances in Orphans (2013) and Sea Wall/A Life (2020). He was nominated for the Laurence Olivier Award for Best Actor in a Supporting Role for his performance in American Buffalo (2016). Since 2022, Sturridge has starred as Dream in the Netflix fantasy series The Sandman.

Early life
Sturridge was born in Lambeth, London, one of three children of director Charles Sturridge and actress Phoebe Nicholls. His sister, Matilda Sturridge, is also an actress.

Sturridge was educated at The Harrodian School, an independent school in Barnes in South West London, whose pupils included future actors Robert Pattinson, Will Poulter and George MacKay. Between the years 1999 ('Short Half') and 2001, Sturridge attended Winchester College, an independent school for boys in Winchester, Hampshire. He boarded at the College's House E (Morshead's)"Freddie's".

Career
Sturridge began his career working as a child actor and he was in the 1996 television adaptation of Gulliver's Travels, directed by his father and co-starring his mother. He reemerged in 2004 with Vanity Fair and Being Julia. In 2005 he played William Herbert, 3rd Earl of Pembroke in BBC4's A Waste of Shame.

In 2006, he played the role of Nigel in the psychological thriller Like Minds, also known by the title of Murderous Intent. It tells the story of two boys, Alex (played by Eddie Redmayne) and Nigel, placed together as room-mates, much to Alex's objections. Alex is horrified and yet fascinated with the ritual-influenced deaths that begin to occur around them, and when Nigel himself is murdered, Alex is blamed.

He was originally cast as the lead in the sci-fi trilogy Jumper. However in 2006, two months into production, New Regency and 20th Century Fox, fearing the gamble of spending over $100 million on a film starring an unknown actor, replaced him with the "more prominent" Hayden Christensen.

In 2009, he appeared as Carl, one of the lead roles in the Richard Curtis comedy The Boat That Rocked (known as Pirate Radio in the United States), alongside Bill Nighy, Rhys Ifans and Philip Seymour Hoffman. In September, 2009, he made his stage debut in Punk Rock, a then newly dramatised play by Simon Stephens at the Lyric Hammersmith Theatre, appearing as a character loosely modelled after the teenage killers at Columbine High School. For that performance, he was nominated for Most Outstanding Newcomer in the 2009 Evening Standard Awards, and won the 2009 Critics' Circle Theatre Award in that same category.

He appeared alongside Rachel Bilson in the 2011 indie-romance Waiting for Forever. He also played a role loosely based on poet Allen Ginsberg in Walter Salles's 2012 film adaptation of Jack Kerouac's On the Road. In the spring of 2013, he starred in the Broadway play Orphans as Phillip, who is developmentally disabled, for which he was nominated for the Tony Award, Best Performance by an Actor in a Leading Role in a Play for his performance. In 2017, he starred as Winston Smith in the Broadway production of 1984. In 2019, Sturridge starred opposite Jake Gyllenhaal in the Broadway play Sea Wall/A Life, for which he received a nomination for the Tony Award for Best Leading Actor in a Play.

In January 2021, Sturridge was confirmed to be playing Dream of The Endless / Lord Morpheus in the Netflix adaptation of The Sandman. In a May 2022 interview, The Sandman author Neil Gaiman estimated he had personally seen "about fifteen hundred" actors' auditions for the lead character of Morpheus, but stated that Sturridge had been among the likeliest to be chosen for the role from the time of "the first ten auditions."

Personal life
From 2011-2015, Sturridge was dating actress Sienna Miller. Their daughter was born in July 2012.

Sturridge's maternal grandparents are actors Anthony Nicholls and Faith Kent, and his great-grandfather is photojournalist Horace Nicholls.

Filmography

Film

Television

Theatre

Awards and nominations

References

External links

1985 births
English male child actors
English male film actors
English male stage actors
English male television actors
Living people
People educated at Winchester College
People educated at The Harrodian School
People from Lambeth
20th-century English male actors
21st-century English male actors
Male actors from London
Theatre World Award winners